Usman Dar (Urdu: عثمان ڈار) is a Pakistani politician who was Special Adviser to the former Prime Minister of Pakistan, Imran Khan on Youth Affairs. He was in office from 3rd of December 2018 till his resignation from the parliament on 10th of April 2022. He also held the position of Chairman of the Prime Minister’s Youth Programme during his term.

Personal Life

Usman Dar was born on 28th of August 1974 in Sialkot, Pakistan. He belongs to a Punjabi speaking Kashmiri family. He is a married man with two kids.

Education

Dar has a Bachelor of Commerce degree from the University of the Punjab. 

In his nomination papers for 2013 general election, Dar claimed to have received the degree of Master of Business Administration from the Schiller International University, London in 1997.

In November 2017, Schiller International University was found to be a degree mill and Dar's MBA degree was found to be dubious after the Department for Education of the United Kingdom said that it does not recognize the university.

Dar did not declare his MBA degree in his nomination papers for 2018 general election and only mentioned his graduation degree from the University of the Punjab.

Political career
He ran for the seat of the Provincial Assembly of the Punjab as an independent candidate from Constituency PP-122 (Sialkot-II) in 2008 Pakistani general election but was unsuccessful. He received only 54 votes and lost the seat to Chaudhry Muhammad Akhlaq.

He ran for the seat of the National Assembly of Pakistan as a candidate of Pakistan Tehreek-e-Insaf (PTI) from Constituency NA-110 (Sialkot-I) in 2013 Pakistani general election but was unsuccessful. He received 71,573 votes and lost the seat to Khawaja Muhammad Asif.

He ran for the seat of the National Assembly as a candidate of PTI from Constituency NA-73 (Sialkot-II) in 2018 Pakistani general election but was unsuccessful. He received 115,464 votes and lost the seat to Khawaja Muhammad Asif.

On 10 October 2018, Prime Minister Imran Khan appointed Dar as Chairman of the Prime Minister’s Youth Programme. On 12 October, a resolution was submitted in the Provincial Assembly of the Punjab against the appointment of Dar due to his dubious degree. The resolution also noted that appointment was "clear violation of merit and unacceptable as he had suffered a massive defeat in the general elections". On 13 October, Pakistan Today also noted that Dar's appointment as chairman of the Prime Minister’s Youth Programme violates 2014 order of Lahore High Court.

On 3 December 2018, Prime Minister Imran Khan appointed him as his Special Assistant to PM on Youth Affairs.

References

Living people
Pakistan Tehreek-e-Insaf politicians
Pakistani people of Kashmiri descent
People from Sialkot District
Imran Khan administration
Year of birth missing (living people)
University of the Punjab alumni